Jackson County is a county located in the U.S. state of Michigan. Its population was 160,366 as of the 2020 Census. The county seat is Jackson. The county was set off in 1829 and organized in 1832. It is named for U.S. President Andrew Jackson and considered to be one of Michigan's "Cabinet counties", named for members of Jackson's Cabinet.

Jackson County comprises the Jackson, MI Metropolitan Statistical Area.

The Jackson County Courthouse was designed by Claire Allen, a prominent southern Michigan architect. Jackson County is also home to the Michigan Whitetail Hall of Fame.

Geography

Rivers

Grand River
The Grand River is Michigan's longest river. It starts in Somerset Township in Hillsdale County and Liberty Township in Jackson County. It then flows through a small part of Columbia Township, into Summit township, and then right through the Jackson city limits. It then flows through Blackman Charter Township and then Rives Township and Tompkins Township before entering Ingham County, Eaton County, Clinton County, Ionia County, Kent County, Ottawa County and into the city of Grand Haven where it empties into Lake Michigan.

Kalamazoo River
The Kalamazoo River is made up of the north and south branches.

The north branch starts in Jackson County in Hanover Township. It starts in Pine Hills Lake and Farewell Lake and flows through a small part of Liberty Township and then back into Hanover Township. It then flows into Spring Arbor Township and Concord Township. It then flows out of Jackson County and into Calhoun County before it goes through the town of Albion where the north branch connects with the south branch and they form to be one river.

The south branch starts in the wetlands near the town North Adams in Hillsdale County and flows through the rest of Hillsdale County. It enters Jackson County and goes through a small part of Hanover Township before reentering Hillsdale County and then reentering Jackson County where it goes through Pulaski Township. It then enters Calhoun County and  connects with the northern branch when it reaches the town of Albion.

When the south branch and north branch connect to form just the Kalamazoo River, it then flows through the rest of Calhoun County. It then enters Kalamazoo County and then Allegan County. When it reaches the towns of Saugatuck and Douglas it stops and enters Lake Michigan.

Adjacent counties
Livingston County  (northeast)
Ingham County  (north)
Eaton County  (northwest)
Washtenaw County  (east)
Calhoun County  (west)
Lenawee County  (southeast)
Hillsdale County  (southwest)

Highways

Government

The county government operates the county jail, maintains township roads, operates the major local courts, keeps files of deeds and mortgages, maintains vital records, administers public health regulations, and participates with the state in the provision of welfare and other social services. The county board of commissioners controls the budget but has only limited authority to make laws or ordinances.  In Michigan, most local government functions – police and fire, building and zoning, tax assessment, street maintenance, etc. – are the responsibility of individual cities and townships.

Elected officials
 Michigan State House of Representatives, State Representative District 64: Julie Alexander (R)
 Michigan State House of Representatives, State Representative District 65: Mike Shirkey (R)
 Michigan State Senate, State Senate District 17: Randy Richardville President pro tempore (R)
 Michigan State Senate, State Senate District 19: Mike Nofs (R)
 Prosecuting Attorney: Jerry Jarzynka
 Sheriff: Gary R. Schuette 
 County Clerk/Register of Deeds: Amanda L. Riska
 County Treasurer: Karen Coffman
 Drain Commissioner: Geoffrey W. Snyder
 County Surveyor: Dean R. Gutekunst
 County Commissioners: Tony Bair District 1, Rodney Walz District 2, Corey Kennedy District 3, Philip Duckham District 4, Chairman James Shotwell Jr. District 5, Earl Poleski District 6, Daniel J. Mahoney District 7, Darius Williams District 8, and Ray Snell District 9.

(information as of February 21, 2013)

Demographics

As of the census of 2000, there were 158,422 people, 58,168 households, and 40,833 families residing in the county.  The population density was 224 people per square mile (87/km2).  There were 62,906 housing units at an average density of 89/sq mi (34/km2).  The racial makeup of the county was 88.54% White, 7.92% Black or African American, 0.40% Native American, 0.53% Asian, 0.04% Pacific Islander, 0.83% from other races, and 1.74% from two or more races.  2.20% of the population were Hispanic or Latino of any race.  24.3% were of English, 21.7% of German, 11.5% American, 9.9% Irish and 8.1% Polish ancestry according to the 2012 American Community Survey. 95.9% spoke English and 2.1% Spanish as their first language.

There were 58,168 households, out of which 33.50% had children under the age of 18 living with them, 53.80% were married couples living together, 12.00% had a female householder with no husband present, and 29.80% were non-families. 24.60% of all households were made up of individuals, and 9.60% had someone living alone who was 65 years of age or older.  The average household size was 2.55 and the average family size was 3.03.

In the county, the population was spread out, with 25.60% under the age of 18, 8.10% from 18 to 24, 30.40% from 25 to 44, 23.00% from 45 to 64, and 12.90% who were 65 years of age or older.  The median age was 37 years. For every 100 females there were 104.20 males.  For every 100 females age 18 and over, there were 103.70 males.

The median income for a household in the county was $43,171, and the median income for a family was $50,970. Males had a median income of $38,919 versus $26,448 for females. The per capita income for the county was $20,171.  About 6.50% of families and 9.00% of the population were below the poverty line, including 12.40% of those under age 18 and 6.10% of those age 65 or over.

Parks and recreation
Blackman Park: a small city park on Michigan Avenue in the middle of the city of Jackson, contains a fountain in the middle of the park honoring soldiers from the Civil War, a few benches and some foliage.
Bloomfield Park: a small park in the Jackson city limits on Michigan Avenue. There are picnic tables, basketball courts, tennis courts, baseball/softball fields and a small playground.
Falling Waters Trail: 10.5-mile asphalt rail-trail follows the old rail bed of the former Michigan Central Railroad from Weatherwax Road in Jackson to the village of Concord. The trail has been dedicated as a Jackson County Park. The trail is mostly rural, with only a few road crossings. It also crosses the Lime Lake County Park (5501 Teft Road) where you can drop a line for fish. The trail continues as the Intercity Trail for another 3.4 miles from Weatherwax Road to Morrell Street. 
YMCA Storer Camp: a campground in Napoleon Township in the eastern part of the county. It is located on Stony Lake in a wooded area with wetlands.
Camp Teetonkah: a campground for Boy Scout troops. It was created in 1912 and is the second oldest Boy Scout camp in America. Usually every spring, all the local Boy Scout troops in the area come and compete against each other for the weekend. It has a dining hall and bathrooms with showers. It is located in Leoni Township in the eastern part of the county.
Sparks Park and The Cascades (AKA Cascade Falls Park): one of the larger parks in the country. The park contains the Cascades Championship Golf Course, one with 18 holes and a short course with 9 hole, as well as two large play structures, basketball court, baseball and softball fields and a popular paved walking path.  It is famous for its Cascade Manor House and Cascade Falls (Jackson, Michigan), which is one of the largest man-made waterfalls in the world, with 6 immense fountains, 3 reflecting pools and 16 falls. The park is also home to the Cascades Ice Cream Co. which opens when there is usually still snow on the ground and stays open until October.  Every late August, the annual Cascades Civil War Muster is held there. There are some man-made ponds and wetlands with many types of water fowl.  In 2012, the urban fishery opened, stocked with blue gill and large mouth bass. This pond features informative signs, a large picnic gazebo and a fishing pier, accessible by wheelchair. Part of it is in the city limits of Jackson, but most is in Summit Township.
Dahlem Environmental Education Center: is a nature center located in Summit Township in the southern part of the county. It has an educational center, five miles of trails, many ponds, wetlands, and a forest area. A resurfaced 3/8 mile trail has been specially redesigned for visitors with limited mobility. Dahlem is also known to have one of the largest eastern bluebird trails.
Ella Sharp Park: the largest city park located on 562 acres along the banks of the southwest branch of the Grand River in the city of Jackson. It consists of a golf course, a miniature golf course, a golf learning center, flower gardens, miles of hiking & biking trails, a basketball court, soccer fields, softball fields, the Peter Hurst Planetarium, and the Ella Sharp Museum. The Ella Sharp Park is the host to the annual Jackson Hot Air Jubilee in July.
Grand River Nature Preserve: a preserve located near Grand Lake where the Grand River starts in the lower part of Jackson County in Liberty Township.
Green Park: a small park on the northern part of the Jackson city limits in Blackman Township it is right by Interstate 94 (I-94). The Grand River goes through the outskirts of the park, the Penn Central Transportation Company railroad track also goes through the park. An old train engine car lies in the park as a monument.  The park consist of some ponds and many water fowl.
Loomis Park: a small park in the Jackson city limits. It consist of picnic tables, two outdoor basketball courts, two outdoor tennis courts, baseball/softball fields and a large wooden playground. The park also contains the Boos Recreation Center which hosts a variety of classes, events and workshops year-round.
MacCready Reserve: a fairly large nature preserve on the west side of the township. The property used to be owned by Thomas C. MacCready in the late 19th century, and after three generations of family, Douglas, Lynn, and Willis MacCready donated the land to Michigan State University in 2001. The area has five hiking trails, some easy and some more difficult ones. The area is managed by the Departments of Forestry, Fisheries and Wildlife, MSU Extension, and MSU Land Management Office. The area contains many forests, rolling hills, and wetlands and even a natural spring. The area is meant to be forest studies and hiking.
Martin Luther King Center: a full service community center part of the Howard Charles Woods Recreational Complex, a small park in the Jackson city limits. It has picnic tables, a playground, two outdoor basketball courts, a tennis court, two baseball/softball fields and a recreation area with some trees and foliage.
Meridian Baseline State Park: a historical park in Henrietta Township in the northern part of the county. The park is currently landlocked by private property and is inaccessible to the public.
Portage Lake County Park: a small 6-acre park on Portage lake in the Waterloo State Recreation Area. It is located in Waterloo Township in the eastern part of the county. It consists of picnic areas, grills, playground, a historic pump house, swimming area, boat launch and beaches on Portage Lake.
Snyder Park: a small park in the small unincorporated village of Horton in Hanover Township in the southwestern part of the county. The park has a gazebo, picnic tables, and a small man-made waterfall that connects to a pond called Mill Pond which is part of the Northern Branch of the Kalamazoo River. The area is also wetland, forest, and the village of Horton.
Sharonville State Game Area: a wilderness wildlife area consisting of forest and swamps.  It is located in Norvell Township in the eastern part of the county and in part of Washtenaw County.
Twin Pines Campground: a large campground in Pulaski Township in the southwestern part of the county. The campground is on the South Branch Kalamazoo River.  There is a playground and a basketball court. The campground allows campers and RVs, as well as traditional camping in a tent.  They feature a dining and activity hall. There is the Kalamazoo River, wetlands, and forest. They also offer a canoe livery.
Vandercook Lake County Park: a small 17-acre park on Vandercook Lake in the village area of Vandercook Lake in Summit Township. It consists of a beach, a swim area, 3 ball diamonds, a boat launch, playground area, fishing area, grills, 2 picnic shelters and modern restrooms.
Waterloo State Recreation Area: the only State Park in Jackson County. The area contains 17 lakes, many ponds and streams, and numerous woods. They have RV or tent camping there. The park offers swimming on Portage Lake, canoeing, fishing, boating, picnicking, and biking. Waterloo State Recreation Area is located in the eastern part of Jackson County and the western part of Washtenaw County.
William Nixon Memorial Park: a small park in the middle of the city of Jackson. It has skateboard ramps, a public water park, including two large water slides, a full-size inline hockey rink as well as four softball fields, playground equipment and a picnic shelter.
4-H Camp McGregor: a small campground, mainly a place for children in Liberty Township. The area has swamps, ponds and forests. It is on the shoreline of Crispell Lake.

Communities

Cities
Jackson (county seat)

Villages
Brooklyn
Cement City (partial)
Concord
Grass Lake
Hanover
Parma
Springport

Charter townships
Blackman Charter Township
Grass Lake Charter Township
Sandstone Charter Township

Civil townships

Columbia Township
Concord Township
Hanover Township
Henrietta Township
Leoni Township
Liberty Township
Napoleon Township
Norvell Township
Parma Township
Pulaski Township
Rives Township
Spring Arbor Township
Springport Township
Summit Township
Tompkins Township
Waterloo Township

Census-designated places
Michigan Center
Napoleon
Spring Arbor
Vandercook Lake
Vineyard Lake

Other unincorporated communities

Clarklake
Horton
Leoni
Liberty
Munith
Norvell
Pleasant Lake
Pulaski
Rives Junction
Sandstone
Tompkins
Waterloo

Education
School districts include:

 Addison Community Schools
 Columbia School District
 Chelsea School District
 Concord Community Schools
 East Jackson Community Schools
 Grass Lake Community Schools
 Hanover-Horton Schools
 Homer Community Schools
 Jackson Public Schools
 Jonesville Community Schools
 Leslie Public Schools
 Litchfield Community Schools
 Manchester Community Schools
 Marshall Public Schools
 Michigan Center School District
 Napoleon Community Schools
 North Adams-Jerome Schools
 Northwest School District
 Springport Public Schools
 Stockbridge Community Schools
 Vandercook Lake Public Schools
 Western School District

See also
 List of Michigan State Historic Sites in Jackson County, Michigan
National Register of Historic Places listings in Jackson County, Michigan

References

External links
Jackson County
Jackson County Convention and Visitors Bureau
Jackson County Chamber of Commerce
The Enterprise Group of Jackson, Inc.

 
Michigan counties
1832 establishments in Michigan Territory
Populated places established in 1832